Medical symptoms are complaints which indicate disease. They are noticed by the patient and cause people to go and see a health practitioner. It is rare that a person would visit a doctor and complain as follows: "Doctor, I have amaurosis fugax." They are more likely to complain of loss of vision. This list is not exhaustive but might be useful as a guide.

Symptoms by presentation

My ... hurts
 abdomen
 back
 chest
 ear
 head
 pelvis
 tooth
 rectum
 skin
 Extremities
 leg
 Chronic pain
I feel:
 Chills
 Fever
 Paresthesia (numbness, tingling, electric tweaks)
 Light-headed
 Dizzy
 Dizzy – about to black out
 Dizzy – with the room spinning around me
 My mouth is dry
 Nauseated
 Sick
 like I have the flu
 like I have to vomit
 Short of breath
 Sleepy
 Sweaty
 Thirsty
 Tired
 Weak

I can't:
 Breathe normally
 Hear normally:
 losing hearing
 sounds are too loud
 ringing or hissing in my ears
 Move one side – arm and/or leg
 Pass a bowel action normally
 Pass urine normally
 Remember normally
 See properly:
 Blindness
 blurred vision
 double vision
 Sleep normally
 Smell things normally
 Speak normally
 Stop passing watery bowel actions
 Stop scratching
 Stop sweating
 Swallow normally
 Taste properly
 Walk normally
 Write normally

Medical signs and symptoms

Where available, ICD-10 codes are listed. When codes are available both as a sign/symptom (R code) and as an underlying condition, the code for the sign is used.

When there is no symptoms for a disease that a patient has, the patient is said to be asymptomatic.

 General
 anorexia (R63.0)
 weight loss (R63.4)
 cachexia (R64)
 chills and shivering
 convulsions (R56)
 deformity
 discharge
 dizziness / Vertigo (R42)
 fatigue (R53)
 malaise
 asthenia
 hypothermia (T68)
 jaundice (P58, P59, R17)
 muscle weakness (M62.8)
 pyrexia (R50)
 sweats
 swelling
 swollen or painful lymph node(s) (I88, L04, R59.1)
 weight gain (R63.5)
 Cardiovascular
 arrhythmia
 bradycardia (R00.1)
 chest pain (R07)
 claudication
 palpitations (R00.2)
 tachycardia (R00.0)
 Ear, Nose and Throat
 dry mouth (R68.2)
 epistaxis (R04.0)
 halitosis
 hearing loss
 nasal discharge
 otalgia (H92.0)
 otorrhea (H92.1)
 sore throat
 toothache
 tinnitus (H93.1)
 trismus
 Gastrointestinal
 abdominal pain (R10)
 bloating (R14)
 belching (R14)
 bleeding:
 Hematemesis
 blood in stool: melena (K92.1), hematochezia
 constipation (K59.0)
 diarrhea (A09, K58, K59.1)
 dysphagia (R13)
 dyspepsia (K30)
 fecal incontinence
 flatulence (R14)
 heartburn
 nausea (R11)
 odynophagia
 proctalgia fugax
 pyrosis (R12)
 Rectal tenesmus
 steatorrhea
 vomiting (R11)
 Integumentary
 Hair:
 alopecia
 hirsutism
 hypertrichosis
 nail: 
 Skin:
 abrasion
 anasarca (R60.1)
 bleeding into the skin
 petechia
 purpura
 ecchymosis and bruising (Sx0 (x=0 through 9))
 blister (T14.0)
 edema (R60)
 itching (L29)
 Janeway lesions and Osler's node
 laceration
 rash (R21)
 urticaria (L50)
 Neurological
 abnormal posturing
 acalculia
 agnosia
 alexia
 amnesia
 anomia
 anosognosia
 aphasia and apraxia
 apraxia
 ataxia
 cataplexy (G47.4)
 confusion
 dysarthria
 dysdiadochokinesia
 dysgraphia
 hallucination
 headache (R51)
 hypokinetic movement disorder:
 akinesia
 bradykinesia
 hyperkinetic movement disorder:
 akathisia
 athetosis
 ballismus
 blepharospasm
 chorea
 dystonia
 fasciculation
 muscle cramps (R25.2)
 myoclonus
 opsoclonus
 tic
 tremor
 flapping tremor
 insomnia (F51.0, G47.0)
 Lhermitte's sign (as if an electrical sensation shoots down back & into arms)
 loss of consciousness
 Syncope (medicine) (R55)
 neck stiffness
 opisthotonus
 paralysis and paresis
 paresthesia (R20.2)
 prosopagnosia
 somnolence (R40.0)
 Obstetric / Gynaecological
 abnormal vaginal bleeding
 vaginal bleeding in early pregnancy / miscarriage
 vaginal bleeding in late pregnancy
 amenorrhea
 infertility
 painful intercourse (N94.1)
 pelvic pain
 vaginal discharge
 Ocular
 amaurosis fugax (G45.3) and amaurosis
 blurred vision
 Dalrymple's sign
 double vision (H53.2)
 exophthalmos (H05.2)
 mydriasis/miosis (H570)
 nystagmus
 Psychiatric
 amusia
 anhedonia
 anxiety
 apathy
 confabulation
 depression
 delusion
 euphoria
 homicidal ideation
 irritability
 mania (F30)
 paranoid ideation
 phobia: 
 suicidal ideation
 Pulmonary
 apnea and hypopnea
 cough (R05)
 dyspnea (R06.0)
 bradypnea (R06.0) and tachypnea (R06.0)
 orthopnea and platypnea
 trepopnea
 hemoptysis (R04.2)
 pleuritic chest pain
 sputum production (R09.3)
 Rheumatologic
 arthralgia
 back pain
 sciatica
 Urologic
 dysuria (R30.0)
 hematospermia
 hematuria (R31)
 impotence (N48.4)
 polyuria (R35)
 retrograde ejaculation
 strangury
 urethral discharge
 urinary frequency (R35)
 urinary incontinence (R32)
 urinary retention

See also

 List of ICD-9 codes 780-799: Symptoms, signs, and ill-defined conditions

References

Symptoms
Symptoms